Alucita bridarollii is a moth of the family Alucitidae. It is found in Paraguay.

References

Moths described in 1951
Alucitidae
Moths of South America